Crematogaster boera is a species of ant in tribe Crematogastrini. It was described by Ruzsky in 1926.

References

boera
Insects described in 1926